CD300A (Cluster of Differentiation 300A) is a human gene.

The CMRF35 antigen (CMRF35A; MIM 606786), which was identified by reactivity with a monoclonal antibody, is present on monocytes, neutrophils, and some T and B lymphocytes. CMRF35H is recognized by the same antibody and is distinct from CMRF35 (Green et al., 1998).[supplied by OMIM]

See also
 Cluster of differentiation

References

Further reading

External links
 
 CD300a, Bernholtz - The Possible End to Asthma - The Future of Things article
 
 

Clusters of differentiation